The Diocese of Little Rock is a Latin Church ecclesiastical jurisdiction or diocese of the Catholic Church composed of the entire U.S. state of Arkansas. It was established on November 28, 1843.  The seat of the diocese is the Cathedral of St. Andrew in Little Rock. The Diocese of Little Rock is a suffragan diocese in the ecclesiastical province of the metropolitan Archdiocese of Oklahoma City.

History

Establishment of the diocese

In 1820 Bishop Louis William Valentine Dubourg visited the Osage Indians and, after him, Father Croix. Under Bishop Rosati, the Lazarists, from their seminary at the Barrens, Missouri, did praiseworthy missionary work from 1824 to 30 among the Indians and scattered settlers. The most noted secular priest of these times was Rev. Richard Bole, who established St. Mary's Mission, five miles below the present Pine Bluff, and brought there in 1838, from St. Geneviève, Missouri, five Sisters of Loretto, who opened the first Catholic school in Arkansas. The State of Arkansas and the Indian Territory, parts of the Louisiana Purchase, were formed in 1843, into the Diocese of Little Rock. Rev. Andrew Byrne, pastor of St. Andrew Church (New York City), was consecrated the first bishop, March 10, 1844.

Bishop Byrne, born in Navan, Ireland, in 1802, and ordained by Bishop England at Charleston, South Carolina, November 11, 1827, brought from New York to Arkansas Fathers Corry of Albany and Donohoe of Troy, New York. All the priests of the earlier days had gone. The Catholic population of the diocese was not more than 1000. Bishop Byrne secured from Naas, Ireland, thirteen Sisters of Mercy, who established in 1850, St. Mary's Academy at Little Rock, and in 1851, St. Ann's Academy at Fort Smith. An imposing frame cathedral was erected in Little Rock, and modest structures were built in several parts of the State. During the Civil War from 1861 to 1865, church work came to a halt. Bishop Byrne died on June 10, 1862.

The diocese remained sede vacante, with Very Rev. P. O'Reilly, V.G., as administrator until February 3, 1867, when Rev. Edward Fitzgerald, pastor of St. Patrick's Church, Columbus, Ohio, became bishop. Bishop Fitzgerald was born in 1833, at Limerick, Ireland. He entered the Lazarist Seminary at the Barrens, Missouri, in 1850, and was subsequently a student at Mount St. Mary's, Cincinnati, and Mount St. Mary's, Emmitsburg, where he was ordained in 1857 by Archbishop Purcell. Bishop Fitzgerald was consecrated on February 3, 1867. He found in his diocese four parishes, five priests, and a Catholic population of 1600. He began work to secure Catholic immigration for the State, sisters for schools and priests for missions. Benedictine monks from St. Meinrad, Indiana, came in 1876 to Logan County and soon flourishing German settlements arose. The Holy Ghost Fathers of Pittsburgh, Pennsylvania, established in 1879 successful German colonies near Morrilton. A Polish settlement was made at Marche in 1880, and Italians came later to Sunnyside, Tontitown, New Gascony, and Barton. On May 27, 1894, Bishop Fitzgerald dedicated the first church in Arkansas for African-Americans at Pine Bluff, where there had been established an excellent industrial school, now in care of the Sisters of the Holy Family. Monsignor John B. Morris, V.G., of Nashville, Tennessee, was consecrated Coadjutor Bishop of Little Rock, June 11, 1906, and on the death of Bishop Fitzgerald in 1907, assumed full control of a diocese with a Catholic population of 20,000.

The Indian Territory, since it was created a vicariate in 1891, ceased to be part of the Diocese of Little Rock. Bishop Morris, who assumed control of the diocese in 1907, was born at Hendersonville, Tennessee, June 29, 1866. His theological studies were made at the American College, Rome, and he was ordained priest on June 11, 1892, in the Basilica of St. John Lateran, by Cardinal Parocchi. After several years' rectorship of the cathedral in Nashville, Bishop Byrne appointed him in 1901, vicar-general, and in 1905 Pius X elevated him to the rank of domestic prelate. Bishop Morris opened Little Rock College (1908), and St. Joseph's orphan asylum. The first diocesan synod was held on February 16, 1909, at Little Rock, and the first normal school of instruction for Catholic teachers was inaugurated at Little Rock, June 11, 1909.

Twenty-first century
On April 10, 2008, Pope Benedict XVI named Anthony B. Taylor as the new bishop of the Diocese of Little Rock. Bishop Taylor was ordained to the post June 5 and in September that year became the first American bishop to join the social media website Facebook.

On September 28, 2007, Msgr. J. Gaston Hebert, the diocese administrator (per the July 11 Congregation for the Doctrine of the Faith) stated that 6 Arkansas nuns were excommunicated for heresy (the first in the diocese's 165-year history). They refused to recant the doctrines of the Community of the Lady of All Nations (Army of Mary). The 6 nuns are members of the Good Shepherd Monastery of Our Lady of Charity and Refuge in Hot Springs. Sister Mary Theresa Dionne, 82, one of the 6, said they will still live at the convent property, which they own. The sect believed that its 86-year-old founder, Marie Paule Giguere, is the reincarnation of the Virgin Mary. As of 2008, they continued their daycare operation but were no longer affiliated with the Diocese of Little Rock.

Following the issuance of Pope Francis's July 2021 motu proprio Traditionis custodes, Bishop Taylor was among the first American bishops to announce that the Tridentine Mass would no longer be offered at diocesan parishes. Bishop Taylor ended the practice at three parishes but permitted its continued celebration at two personal parishes operated by priests of the Priestly Fraternity of Saint Peter.

Reports of sex abuse
On September 10, 2018, the Diocese of Little Rock released a "preliminary" list of eight priests who served in the Diocese and who were "credibly accused" of engaging in sex abuse of minors. In a written statement, Bishop Anthony B. Taylor acknowledged the history of abuse in the Diocese and issued an apology. The list also contained the names of four additional predator priests who were transferred to the Diocese of Little Rock to avoid scrutiny in other Dioceses where they were suspected to have molested children.  One of the priests on the list, Paul Haas, had no known reports of sex abuse when he served in the Diocese of Little Rock, but had multiple reports when he served in the Diocese of Nashville in Tennessee. Anthony McCay, who was ordained in 1960, had 10 victims in other states before he was transferred to the Diocese of Little Rock in 1991, where no claims of abuse were reported against him.

Most on the list, including Hass and McCay, are deceased. Most also began serving the Diocese of Little Rock before the 1980s. Donald Althoff, who was ordained in 1982 and later removed from ministry in 1995 following a three year leave of absence, was also the only priest on this list who was not ordained before the 1980s as well. Francis Zimmer, who was ordained in Texas in 1932, was transferred to the Diocese of Little Rock in 1960, despite previous reports that he had molested three minors while serving the Catholic church in Texas. The earliest priest on the list who committed abuse in the Diocese of Little Rock, Edward Mooney, was ordained in 1949 and wasn't laicized until 1974.

In July 2019, it was revealed that the Diocese of Little Rock paid a total settlement of $790,000 to five alleged victims of former Diocese priest John McDaniel. McDaniel committed the alleged abuse while serving an associate pastor at Our Lady of the Holy Souls Catholic Church in Little Rock, where he began serving in 1970. McDaniel, who was also mentioned on the Diocese's list of accused clergy, died in 1974. In August 2019, another alleged victim filed a lawsuit against St. Joseph's Catholic Church in Tontitown. The lawsuit against both the Diocese of Little Rock and the northwest Arkansas church centers around listed "credibly accused" priest Joseph Correnti, who died in 2002 after committing suicide and was accused of sexually abusing the plaintiff between 1995 and 2002.

Bishops
The following are lists of bishops and their years of service:

Bishops of Little Rock
 Andrew Byrne (1843-1862)
 Edward Fitzgerald (1866-1907)
 John Baptist Morris (1907-1946; coadjutor bishop 1906-1907)
 Albert Lewis Fletcher (1946-1972)
 Andrew Joseph McDonald (1972-2000)
 J. Peter Sartain (2000-2006), appointed Bishop of Joliet in Illinois and later Archbishop of Seattle
 Anthony Basil Taylor (2008–present)

Auxiliary bishops
Albert Lewis Fletcher (1939-1946), appointed Bishop of Little Rock
Lawrence Preston Joseph Graves (1969-1973), appointed Bishop of Alexandria

Other priest of this diocese who became bishop
Francis Ignatius Malone, appointed Bishop of Shreveport in 2019
Erik T. Pohlmeier, appointed Bishop of St. Augustine in 2022

Schools 

In 2013 there were 6,913 students in Catholic schools in Arkansas. In the 1960s there were 11,500 students in Arkansas Catholic schools; this was the peak enrollment. During that decade, ten of the Catholic schools in Arkansas were for black people. None of those schools remained open by 2013.

High schools and schools with high school sections:
 Catholic High School for Boys, Little Rock (All-Boys)
 Mount St. Mary Academy, Little Rock (All-Girls)
 Sacred Heart School, Morrilton
 St. Joseph School, Conway
 Subiaco Academy, Subiaco (All-Boys)
 Ozark Catholic Academy, Tontitown - Founded in 2018 as an Independent Catholic High School. The first Catholic High School in the Northwest Arkansas Area.

Grade schools include:

 St. Vincent de Paul Catholic School, Rogers (K-8th Grade)

 North Little Rock Catholic Academy – Formed in 2007 by the merger of St. Mary School and St. Patrick School.
 St. Paul Catholic School, Pocahontas
 Christ the King Catholic School, Little Rock (K-8th Grade)
 Holy Souls Catholic School, Little Rock (K-8th Grade)
 St. Theresa Catholic School, Little Rock (K-8th Grade)
 Immaculate Conception Catholic School, North Little Rock (K-8th Grade)
 Immaculate Heart of Mary Catholic School, North Little Rock (K-8th Grade)
St. John Catholic School, Russellville (Montesorri Pre K - 5th Grade)
St. Joseph Catholic School, Fayetteville (K-8th Grade)

Defunct schools 
Schools with high school sections:
 St. Joseph Catholic School – Pine Bluff – Grades 5–12, opened in 1993, closed in 2013
 St. Peter's Catholic School – Grades Preschool through 6 – The first school in Arkansas for black children to be established, was established in 1889 by St. Joseph Church Pastor Monsignor John Michael "J.M." Lucey as the Colored Industrial Institute and in 1897 became St. Peter Academy a.k.a. St. Peter High School. It closed in 1975, and reopened as an elementary school operated by the School Sisters of Notre Dame in 1985. It closed permanently in 2012. It was the last Catholic school established for black students in the State of Arkansas.
 St. Bartholomew High School – Little Rock – A majority black school, it closed in 1964

Schools without high school sections:
 St. Raphael School – Springdale – Closed in 2013
 Immaculate Conception School – Blytheville – Closed in 2007
 Our Lady of Good Counsel School – Little Rock – Closed in 2006
 Holy Redeemer School – El Dorado – Closed in 2005
 St. Augustine School – North Little Rock – A majority black school, it closed in 1976
 St. Bartholomew School – Little Rock – A majority black school, it closed in 1974
 St. John the Baptist School – Fort Smith – A majority black school, it closed in 1968
 St. Gabriel School – Hot Springs – A majority black school, it closed in 1968
 Good Shepherd School – Conway – A majority black school, it closed in 1965
 St. Cyprian School – Helena – A majority black school, it closed in 1963
 St. Raphael School – Pine Bluff – A majority black school, it closed in 1960

See also

 Ecclesiastical Province of Oklahoma City
 Catholic Church by country
 Catholic Church in the United States
 Global organisation of the Catholic Church
 List of Roman Catholic archdioceses (by country and continent)
 List of Roman Catholic dioceses (alphabetical) (including archdioceses)
 List of Roman Catholic dioceses (structured view) (including archdioceses)
 List of the Catholic dioceses of the United States

References

External links 
 Roman Catholic Diocese of Little Rock Official Site

 
Roman Catholic Ecclesiastical Province of Oklahoma City
Catholic Church in Arkansas
Little Rock
Little Rock
Little Rock
1843 establishments in Arkansas
Christianity in Little Rock, Arkansas